The following is a list of episodes from the New Zealand comedy Go Girls. The show started airing on 19 February 2009 and ran until finishing its fifth season in 2013.

Series overview

Season 1 (2009)
Four friends on Auckland's North Shore decide to turn their lives around by setting new year's resolutions they will each achieve in one year. Amy will be rich, and buy back her house. Britta will be famous. Cody will be married and Kevin....will get a new sports steering wheel. But as with any dream the Go Girls find that things don't always go the way you plan...

Season 2 (2010)

On 29 April 2009 TVNZ and NZ On Air confirmed that the show had been commissioned for a second season due to strong ratings and its dominance of its Thursday 8:30 pm time-slot. Season 2 of Go Girls sees the girls and Kevin trying to achieve brand new years resolutions. Amy will help one person a month. Britta will find true love. Cody will make her marriage to Eli work while Kevin will "aim higher" (Whatever that means!).

Season 3 (2011)
After consistently dominating its timeslot Go Girls was renewed for a third season on 6 May 2010. Season 3 sees the characters nearing the end of their 20s and setting new goals for the year. Kevin decides he wants to be a dad. Cody decides to take care of her family. Britta wants a new career. Brad wants to travel the world, with Britta at his side while Olivia just wants to live....

Season 4 (2012)
While Series 3 was still airing TV2 announced the show would return for a fourth series after the third series was another ratings winner. The story skips ahead one year and this time it's about priorities, the price of success and deciding when is it time to settle down?

Season 5 (2013)
Now that Amy, Britta, Brad, Cody, Olivia and Kevin have successfully navigated their way through the minefield of their 20s, season five will introduce new friends who decide to try and take some control over their lives in an otherwise rather random universe.

References

Lists of comedy television series episodes